Hazel Guggenheim King-Farlow McKinley (April 30, 1903 – June 10, 1995) was an American painter, art collector, and art benefactor.

Personal life
McKinley, was born Barbara Hazel Guggenheim, on April 30, 1903 in New York City to Benjamin and Fleurette (Seligman) Guggenheim.  The marriage united two wealthy German-Jewish families, although their wealth did not protect them from anti-Semitism  Born into the well-known Guggenheim family she grew up in New York, alongside her sisters Benita Guggenheim and Marguerite "Peggy" Guggenheim who would become the influential gallery proprietor, art collector, museum founder, and midwife to the Abstract Expressionism art movement.  Her father Benjamin gave up much of his financial interest in the family's mining business to start his own business in Paris.  With his business failing and amid much womanizing, in 1912 he set out to return to the United States in time for Hazel's ninth birthday, unfortunately, on the ill-fated Titanic.  HIs body was never recovered. He died at the age of 46 years old. Hazel inherited $450,000, a far cry from the millions she might have inherited if her father had not left the Guggenheim businesses. She later inherited additional money upon the deaths of her mother and older sister, Benita, who died in childbirth. The loss of her father haunted her the rest of her life and in 1969 she recorded "In Memoriam, Titanic Lifeboat Blues."

In 1921, aged 18, after studying at Washington Square College, New York University and as one of the season's debutantes, McKinley married banker Sigmund Marshall Kempner. Divorcing Kempner a year later, she then moved to Paris where she married journalist Milton S. Waldman in 1923 with whom she had two sons, Terence and Benjamin. Tragically, during a later visit back to New York in 1928 both her young sons, Terrence aged four and half years and Benjamin aged 14 months, fell to their deaths in a 13-story fall from the rooftop of the Surrey apartment block. There is much speculation about the details of this tragic incident, however, this event was largely kept hidden from public by the influential Guggenheim family.  McKinley was visiting her cousin who lived in the penthouse apartment. The fall was believed to be accidental, although McKinley "was unable to tell a coherent story of what happened."  Discrepancies in witness accounts caused the police investigation to be re-opened. The second police investigation came to the same conclusion, that the deaths were accidental.  However, within their social circle it was widely believed that she pushed the boys off the roof due to her deteriorating  marriage. Two years after the death of their sons, Hazel and Milton divorced. The mystery surrounding her sons' deaths left her permanently stigmatized.

In 1931 Hazel married the Englishman Denys King-Farlow. They settled in Sussex, UK, and had two children, John King-Farlow, PhD, who became a noted philosopher and poet and Barbara Benita King-Farlow Jacobs Shukman, who became an artist in her own right.  After their divorce the children lived with McKinley in the United States before a custody fight was won by their father, Denys King-Farlow, who moved them back to England. While the marriage to King-Farlow did not last, Hazel continued to use his last name when signing her paintings.

Hazel next married Charles (Chuck) Everett McKinley, Jr, an artist and USAAF pilot, on August 13, 1940, with whom she painted alongside. Chuck McKinley died in 1942 in a plane crash in a farmer's field in Missouri due to stormy weather while moving planes for military training purposes. As an artist, Hazel used the last name McKinley on all of her subsequent work until the end of her life. Hazel went on to marry at least three more times.  On October 1, 1943, McKinley married Army Corporal Larry Leonard in Denver, a former actor and athletic instructor. The wedding was announced in newspapers across the country and much was made of the fact that the bride was 40 and the groom 28 years old and that the bride was marrying down in rank, with previous husbands being a major and a lieutenant. Her next marriage was recorded by a Certificate of Marriage in the Commonwealth of Virginia where the then Hazel G. McKinley, age 49, married F. Keith Cole, age 28, listed as a T.V. projectionist, on July 7, 1952.  In later newspaper accounts, she was listed as Mrs. Hazel Hayes, but further details of this marriage are unknown.

McKinley moved back to Europe for approximately 10 years, then returned to the United States in 1969 and lived in New Orleans until her death in 1995. Upon her death, her only living son, John King-Farlow, wrote a poem in his mother's honor, entitled "Eulogy For My Mother (Hazel Guggenheim McKinley, Artist)." 

Hazel was less well-known than her more famous, and infamous, older sister Peggy Guggenheim, a self-described "art addict," gallery owner, museum founder, early supporter of Jackson Pollock, and midwife to the Abstract Expressionist art movement in New York City. Benjamin Guggenheim, their father, died on the RMS Titanic. He was accompanied by his mistress,  Léontine Aubart, who survived.  Their mother was anxious, over-bearing, and had a habit of repeating phrases twice. They were often left in the care of strict nannies and nurses and were educated only to be wives and mothers. Both escaped the insular, repressive, and intermarrying German-Jewish aristocracy (detailed in the book, Our Crowd: The Great Jewish Families of New York)  in New York City to live bohemian, art- lives, often abroad in Europe. Both underwent rhinoplasty, although Peggy unsuccessfully.  Both were criticized as often absent and poor mothers  Both had quiet breathy voices with a vague British accent, apparently taught at the finishing school, the Jacobi School, they both attended in New York City.  Both demonstrated sexual agency with robust sexual appetites. One of Peggy's biographer's noted that the two sisters had an informal, tongue-in-cheek bet of which one could have sex with a thousand men first.

Despite their similarities, the sisters had an often contentious and competitive relationship. Peggy reported her first memory as being Hazel's birth and the jealousy it aroused.  Peggy considered herself the ugly duckling of the family and was envious of her more attractive sisters. Peggy was reportedly embarrassed by Hazel, steering her friends away from her.  For her part, Hazel felt superior to Peggy, as Peggy was a mere collector of art in comparison to Hazel's being a maker of art.

Hazel died on June 10, 1995, and her two remaining children scattered her ashes on the Mississippi River. A short obituary distributed by the Associated Press noted she was a member of the illustrious New York Guggenheim family, that she was determined to make a name for herself as an artist, that her art works were shown in museums in the United States and Europe, and were in the collections of such celebrities as Greer Garson, Benny Goodman, and Jason Robards, and that she had died of cancer at the age of 92.

Painting and Collecting career 
Hazel McKinley began painting as a teenager and was a prolific artist throughout her life. When she fled New York for Paris at age 19 she studied at the Sorbonne and became part of 1920's bohemian Paris, where she was able to be taught by key modernist artists of the time.  Her primary mediums were ink, water color, tempera, and crayon.

Whilst living in the south of England with Denys King-Farlow in the 1930s, Hazel was influenced by a group of avante-garde artists, and had her first solo exhibition in London in April 1937 at the Coolings Gallery. She received instruction from artists Rowland Suddaby, Raymond Coxon, and Edna Ginesi, becoming associated with the London Group and the Euston Road School.  She painted primarily in watercolor. Her work included still-life, portraits, townscapes and landscapes. Although her first work was done in a "slightly plain palette," her later work in the 1930s brightened, sometimes falling within the realm of fauvism. "Under the influence of the Surrealists, Hazel's paintings after the 1930's became freer, though her work was far more whimsical and humorous than many artists more closely associated with the movement."

In 1939 Hazel fled Europe due to the impending war and returned to the US, living mostly in California. She took brief art lessons from her sister Peggy's one-time husband Max Ernst and much later attended several long summer schools taught by muralist and renowned teacher Xavier Gonzalez.

In her life in the United States and abroad, Hazel met many prominent artists of the Paris, London, and New York art scenes. She told this story about Jackson Pollock, one of her sister's Peggy's art proteges, "Peggy once left Pollack with me at the Chelsea Hotel, saying she could not take him to lunch with her. Pollock was so drunk, he vomited all over the carpet. . .  Years later, the manager asked if I didn't have a Pollock to sell. I told him to cut himself a piece of the carpet."

She continued to paint and ran a small gallery of her own in the late 1950s and early 1960s in West Cornwall, Connecticut. One show at her gallery featured the works of British and Irish painters including Rowland Suddaby, Frank Beteson, Tom Nisbett, and Patrick Swift. Hazel had two of her own works also shown in the same exhibit, a watercolor painted at Positano, Italy and one painted at the Tuileries, Paris. Another featured work was a surrealistic water color portrait of Hazel by London artist Mervyn Peake.

Hazel exhibited her work both in Europe and the United States throughout her long career, mostly at smaller and less prestigious venues. An incomplete listing of her exhibits and museum acquisitions of her work include:  Berkshire Museum, the Galerie Raymond Duncan in Paris, Stendahl Galleries, the Jake Zeitlin Gallery, the Montgomery Museum of Fine Art, the Artists' Own Gallery in London, the Manchester City Art Gallery, and Santa Fe Art Museum. As the case with many artists, and with the added burden of being such an unconventional woman and a Guggenheim heiress, her work was both admired and dismissed by critics.

McKinley's work was only once included in a show by her sister Peggy Guggenheim, most likely due to the difficult relationship between them. In 1943 Hazel was selected to exhibit one of her paintings in Peggy's infamous show '31 Women' in her New York gallery Art of This Century. The exhibition was radical at the time for being one of the first all-woman exhibitions, as well as showing only abstract or Surrealist works.  In 1998 after her death, one of her paintings was exhibited in Peggy Guggenheim's Venice home/museum the Palazzo Venier dei Leioni.

Returning to Europe in the 1960s to live for a decade, Hazel was mentioned in a Walter Winchell column as she gathered American theater people to help Italian flood survivors and also donated paintings for the effort while living in Rome. In her later life she settled in New Orleans, where she continued painting, exhibiting, and even studying art into her eighties at Newcomb College, New Orleans.  Towards the end of her life while confined to bed, her last works were colored pen drawings and sketches.

Like her sister Peggy, Hazel collected major contemporary artworks and she very generously donated these works to public institutions. For example, she donated over 15 works to Wakefield Art Gallery, UK, in the 1930s, and in 1938 Hazel presented the painting Cossacks (Cosaques) by Wassily Kandinsky to the Tate galleries, which would become an important work within the Tate collection.  She also donated to the Tate works by artists Edna Ginesi and Raymond Coxon. She donated many paintings, some her own, to museums across the UK,  including the municipal collections of several English cities including Wakefield, Manchester, and Leeds.

Collections 
Ferens Art Gallery

Lakeland Arts Trust

The Hepworth Wakefield

Leeds Museums and Galleries

Manchester Art Gallery

Bristol Museum & Art Gallery

References

1903 births
1995 deaths
Artists from New York City
20th-century American women artists
American art collectors
Guggenheim family